Christian Bernardi is the name of two people:

 Christian Bernardi (athlete) (born 1970), Sammarinese athlete
 Christian Bernardi (footballer) (born 1990), Argentine footballer